The Rishon LeZion Moshe Dayan railway station is an Israel Railways station in Rishon LeZion. The station is located adjacent to the Moshe Dayan Interchange on the Ayalon Highway. It serves as the terminus of a new suburban passenger line serving the cities of Holon, Bat Yam, and Rishon LeZion in southern Gush Dan. Current travel time from the station to Tel Aviv HaHagana railway station is about 18 minutes.

Future service
The railway line south of the station was extended to the new Yavne West railway station in 2012 and connects with the existing Lod–Ashkelon railway since 2013, thereby offering improved and more direct train service from Tel Aviv to the cities of Yavne, Ashdod, and Ashkelon. Moshe Dayan also serves as a stop on new inter-city services to those cities. From Ashkelon a new railway line has been built to Beersheva and the station serves trains headed there as well. 

Rishon LeZion Moshe Dayan is planned to serve as the western terminus for the future Rishon LeZion–Modi'in railway. A few hundred meters south of the station, a currently unused railway tunnel will allow trains to pass under the Ayalon Highway and travel eastward to Rishon LeZion HaRishonim railway station, from which the new line will continue to reach Modi'in and Jerusalem beyond.

It is anticipated that an extension to the Red Line LRT which is currently under construction, will make Moshe Dayan Station the southern terminus of the Red Line LRT. The future planned Green and Brown LRT lines of the Tel Aviv Light Rail will also terminate at the station (though these are not planned for operation before 2020).

References

External links

Railway stations in Central District (Israel)
Railway stations opened in 2011
2011 establishments in Israel
Rishon LeZion